Houston Sudbury School (HSS) is a non-profit private Sudbury school in Spring Branch, Houston, Texas. The school serves students of ages 6–18 and follows the Sudbury model of self-education.

The democracy is meted out in a weekly school meeting where staff and students discuss and vote on a variety of administrative aspects of the school, including rules. These rules are enforced through a peer justice system called the judicial committee.

History
The school was founded in 2016 by Dominique Side and Cara DeBusk and opened in January of that year.

Its original campus was in Independence Heights.  the school had 23 students; two of them identified as transgender, and the student body originated from various socioeconomic and racial groups. It was scheduled to move into another campus in May 2017, located in Acres Homes.

See also
 List of Sudbury schools
 Sudbury Valley School
 Brazos Valley Sudbury School - Formerly in operation in Waller County, near Houston

References

External links
 Houston Sudbury School

Private K-12 schools in Houston
Sudbury Schools